Pelly is a village in the Canadian province of Saskatchewan within the Rural Municipality of St. Philips No. 301 and Census Division No. 9.

The village is the closest inhabited settlement to the historical sites of Fort Livingstone, a former capital of the North-West Territories and a former North-West Mounted Police headquarters, and Fort Pelly, the Swan River district headquarters for the Hudson's Bay Company, from which the village gets its name.

History 
Pelly incorporated as a village on May 4, 1911.

Climate

Demographics 

See also 
 List of communities in Saskatchewan
 Villages of Saskatchewan

Footnotes

External links

Villages in Saskatchewan
St. Philips No. 301, Saskatchewan
Division No. 9, Saskatchewan